Anthony Lepore (born 1977) is an American artist working in photography and sculpture.

Work 
Lepore's work has investigated the frictions created by the containment and cultural representation of nature. His early work explored people's relationships with animals, focusing his lens on people with their pets, and on animal surgeries and rehabilitation. An extended project called "Bird Shop" consisted of the portraits of passersby gazing into a bird shop window from a busy street in New York City.

Beginning in 2007, Lepore photographed in the visitor centers of National Parks, creating images of displays that challenge the expectations of landscape photography. Describing his images made in these visitor centers, Sarah Lehrer-Graiwer wrote in Artforum that "Lepore homes in on places of rupture that break and undermine photographic illusion."

In more recent works, Lepore has further investigated the relationship of photography to illusionistic representation and invention. For a 2010 exhibition at the Los Angeles Central Library, Lepore created a scaled-down recreation of one of the library's glass cases. Embedded in the larger case, the sculpture's surface was mounted with photographs of the glass case, which had been filled with library books on the topic of the human body and propagation. "Lepore's installation casts the viewer deep into a surreal and uncanny scene by contrasting sculptural anthropomorphism with the odd precision of photographic representation."

Regarding Lepore's still lives, Joanna Szupinska-Myers wrote that "by echoing the effects of digital editing—constructing what he refers to as an “analog illusion”—Lepore's photograph speaks in a language that it simultaneously subverts."

Exhibitions 

Performance Anxiety, Moskowitz Bayse, Los Angeles, 2019
Seeing Each Other, with Michael Henry Hayden, Left Field Gallery, Los Osos, 2018
 The Green Curtain, with Michael Henry Hayden, Del Vaz Projects, Los Angeles, 2017
Splash, Glow, Fullflex at the Bikini Factory, Public Fiction, Los Angeles, 2015
Bikini Factory, Ghebaly Gallery, Los Angeles, 2015
Sleepyhead, The Finley, Los Angeles, 2015
Flash, California Museum of Photography, Riverside, 2014
New Wilderness, Ghebaly Gallery, Los Angeles, 2011
New Wilderness Part Two, M+B Gallery, Los Angeles, 2011
Paper Surrogate, works sited, Los Angeles Central Library, 2010
Restoration, Kemper Museum of Contemporary Art, Kansas City, 2008
Bird Shop, Marvelli Gallery, New York, 2007
I Would Make You My Own, Marvelli Gallery, New York, 2006

Permanent collections 

 J. Paul Getty Museum, Los Angeles
 Los Angeles County Museum of Art, Los Angeles
 Hammer Museum, Los Angeles
 Solomon R. Guggenheim Museum, New York
 Kemper Museum of Contemporary Art, Kansas City
 Yale University Art Gallery, New Haven
 Museum of Contemporary Photography, Chicago
 The Mint Museum of Art, Charlotte
 The Fitchburg Museum of Art, Massachusetts

References

External links 

Living people
1977 births
Date of birth missing (living people)
20th-century American sculptors
American photographers
American contemporary artists
21st-century American sculptors